Abba Solomon Meir Eban (born Aubrey Solomon Meir Eban; 2 February 1915 – 17 November 2002) was an Israeli diplomat and politician, and a scholar of the Arabic and Hebrew languages.

During his career, he served as Foreign Affairs Minister, Education Minister, and Deputy Prime Minister of Israel. He was the second ambassador to the United States and the first Permanent Representative of Israel to the United Nations. He was also Vice President of the United Nations General Assembly and President of the Weizmann Institute of Science.

Early life
Eban was born in Cape Town, South Africa, on 2 February 1915 to Lithuanian Jewish parents; his mother, Alida Sacks, was an aunt of Oliver Sacks, while his father, Avram Solomon, died while Eban was still an infant. Eban's mother moved to the United Kingdom at an early age. As a child, he recalled being sent to his grandfather's house every weekend to study the Hebrew language, Talmud, and Biblical literature. He lived for a period of time in Belfast.

He attended St Olave's Grammar School, then in Southwark, and read Classics and Oriental languages at Queens' College, Cambridge, where he achieved a very rare triple first, studying Hebrew, Arabic, and Persian; these were three of the ten languages he would reportedly master (he enjoyed translating newspapers into Ancient Greek). At the age of 23, he became a Fellow of Pembroke College, a role he held from 1938 to 1939, and was marked for a distinguished academic career.

During his time at University and afterwards, Eban was highly involved in the Federation of Zionist Youth and was editor of its journal, The Young Zionist.  At the outbreak of World War II, he worked for Chaim Weizmann at the World Zionist Organization in London from December 1939.

He served in the British Army in Egypt and Mandate Palestine, becoming an intelligence officer in Jerusalem, where he coordinated and trained volunteers for resistance in the event of a German invasion, serving as a liaison officer for the Allies to the Jewish Yishuv.

After the war he continued in his post, helping to set up and run the British Foreign Office's Middle East Centre for Arab Studies which was originally based in Jerusalem before relocating to Shemlan near Beirut. He was at that time known as "Aubrey Evans".

In 1947, he translated from the original Arabic Maze of Justice: Diary of a Country Prosecutor, a 1937 novel by Tawfiq al-Hakim.

Diplomacy
Eban moved back to London briefly to work in the Jewish Agency's Information Department, from which he was posted to New York, where the United Nations General Assembly was considering the "Palestine Question". In 1947, he was appointed as a liaison officer to the United Nations Special Committee on Palestine, where he was successful in attaining approval for the recommendation of partition of Palestine into Jewish and Arab segments—Resolution 181. At this stage, he changed his name to the Hebrew word Abba, meaning "Father".

Eban continued at the United Nations over the next decade. From 1950 to 1959 he also served as his country's ambassador to the United States. He was renowned for his oratorical skills. As Henry Kissinger stated:I have never encountered anyone who matched his command of the English language. Sentences poured forth in mellifluous constructions complicated enough to test the listener’s intelligence and simultaneously leave him transfixed by the speaker's virtuosity. His knowledge of history and fluency in ten languages enhanced his speech-making in the United Nations, even to skeptical or hostile audiences. In 1952, Eban was elected Vice President of the UN General Assembly. A collection of Eban's speeches before the United Nations' Security Council and General Assembly both at universities and other venues between 1948 and 1968 was compiled in Voice of Israel, recently reissued in eBook form by Plunkett Lake Press.

He was known for his witty remarks. For example, when he was complimented on his perfect Oxford English he replied "Cambridge actually, but in politics one expects to be smeared."

Politics
Eban left the United States in 1959 and returned to Israel, where he was elected to the Knesset (the Israeli parliament) as a member of Mapai. He served under David Ben-Gurion as Minister of Education and Culture from 1960 to 1963, then as deputy to Prime Minister Levi Eshkol until 1966. Through this period (1959–66), he also served as president of the Weizmann Institute in Rehovot.

From 1966 to 1974, Eban served as Israel's foreign minister. He defended the country's reputation after the Six-Day War by asserting, in a speech to the United Nations General Assembly, that Israel acted in response to an imminent threat: "So on the fateful morning of 5 June, when Egyptian forces moved by air and land against Israel's western coast and southern territory, our country's choice was plain." Nonetheless, he was a strong supporter of trading parts of the territories occupied in the war in exchange for peace. He played an important part in the shaping of UN Security Council Resolution 242 in 1967, as well as Resolution 338 in 1973. Among his other high level contacts, Eban was received by Pope Paul VI in 1969.

Eban was at times criticized for not voicing his opinions in Israel's internal debate. However, he was generally known to be on the "dovish" side of Israeli politics and was increasingly outspoken after leaving the cabinet. In 1977 and 1981, it was widely understood that Shimon Peres intended to name Eban Foreign Minister, had the Labor Party won those elections. Eban was offered the chance to serve as minister without portfolio in the 1984 national unity government, but chose to serve instead as Chair of the Knesset's Foreign Affairs and Defense Committee from 1984 to 1988.

His comment that Arabs "never miss an opportunity to miss an opportunity" (i.e., for peace), made after the Geneva peace talks in December 1973, is often quoted.

Later life

In 1988, after three decades in the Knesset, he lost his seat over internal splits in the Labour Party. He devoted the rest of his life to writing and teaching, including serving as a visiting academic at Princeton University, Columbia University and George Washington University. He also narrated television documentaries including Heritage: Civilization and the Jews (PBS, 1984), for which he was host, Israel, A Nation Is Born (1992), and On the Brink of Peace (PBS, 1997).

Eban died in 2002 and was buried in Kfar Shmaryahu, north of Tel Aviv. He was survived by his wife, Shoshana "Suzy" (née Ambache) (sister of Aura Herzog), who died in 2011, and their two children.

Family
Eban's son, Eli Eban, is a clarinettist who teaches at Indiana University. Eli has two children, Yael and Omri Eban.

Eban's brother-in-law was Chaim Herzog, the sixth President of Israel. Herzog's son Isaac Herzog was leader of the Israeli Labor Party from 2013 to 2018 and has been the President of Israel since 7 July 2021.

Eban's cousin, Oliver Sacks, was a neurologist and author. Eban's nephew, Jonathan Lynn, is a filmmaker and scriptwriter known for satirical BBC shows Yes Minister and Yes, Prime Minister. Lynn recounts that the plot of an episode of Yes, Prime Minister ("A Victory for Democracy"), which involved the British Prime Minister bypassing his own Arab-centric bureaucracy by taking the Israeli ambassador's advice, was based on an actual incident narrated to him by Eban.

Awards
In 2001, Eban was awarded the Israel Prize for lifetime achievement and special contribution to society and the State.

Published works
 
 Reissued as an eBook by Plunkett Lake Press. 2015. 
  (Herbert Samuel lecture)
 
 
 
 Reissued as an eBook by Plunkett Lake Press. 2015. .

Citations

General sources and further reading 
 Brecher, Michael. "Eban and Israeli Foreign Policy: Diplomacy, War, and Disengagement." in The Diplomats, 1939-1979 ( Princeton University Press, 2019) pp. 398–435 online.
 Butler, Gavri (2002-11-25). "In Memoriam – Abba Eban". The Commentator, Volume 67, Issue 5. Retrieved 3 January 2016.
 
 Siniver, Asaf. Abba Eban: a biography (Abrams, 2015).
 Siniver, Asaf. "Abba Eban and the Development of American–Israeli Relations, 1950–1959." Diplomacy & Statecraft 26.1 (2015): 65-83. online

External links

 
 Abba Eban profile
 Abba Eban Centre for Israeli Diplomacy (Part of the Harry S. Truman Institute for the Advancement of Peace)
 
 
   A Collection of Abba Eban's speeches (and others)
 Israeli Ministry of Foreign Affairs (Biography and Selected Speeches)
 
 
  by Leon Charney on The Leon Charney Report

1915 births
2002 deaths
20th-century Israeli non-fiction writers
Alignment (Israel) politicians
Alumni of Pembroke College, Cambridge
Alumni of Queens' College, Cambridge
Ambassadors of Israel to the United States
British Army officers
British Army personnel of World War II
British emigrants to Israel
British Jews
British people of Lithuanian-Jewish descent
British people of South African-Jewish descent
British Zionists
Fellows of Pembroke College, Cambridge
Israel Prize for lifetime achievement & special contribution to society recipients
Israeli autobiographers
Israeli expatriates in the United States 
Israeli historians
Israeli Jews
Israeli Labor Party politicians
Israeli people of British-Jewish descent
Israeli people of Lithuanian-Jewish descent
Israeli people of South African-Jewish descent
Israeli political writers
Jewish historians
Jewish Israeli politicians
Jewish military personnel
Jewish non-fiction writers
Mapai politicians
Members of the 4th Knesset (1959–1961)
Members of the 5th Knesset (1961–1965)
Members of the 6th Knesset (1965–1969)
Members of the 7th Knesset (1969–1974)
Members of the 8th Knesset (1974–1977)
Members of the 9th Knesset (1977–1981)
Members of the 10th Knesset (1981–1984)
Members of the 11th Knesset (1984–1988)
Ministers of Culture of Israel
Ministers of Education of Israel
Ministers of Foreign Affairs of Israel
People educated at St Olave's Grammar School
People from Southwark
Permanent Representatives of Israel to the United Nations
Politicians from Cape Town
Presidents of universities in Israel
Presidents of Weizmann Institute of Science
South African emigrants to the United Kingdom
South African Jews
South African people of Lithuanian-Jewish descent
Zionist activists
20th-century Israeli male writers